Scipion was a French warship of the 18th century, lead ship of her class. It was completed in 1779.

Accounts cited that it was one of the three new naval vessels - along with Hercule (1798) and Pluton (1778) - built by the French that was so top-heavy, they nearly capsized. To correct Scipion's problem, a stowage was altered and a ballast replaced a part of the water supply. These remedies, however, failed so the French had to shorten the mast to make it seaworthy.

Scipion took part in the American War of Independence, notably sailing at the rear of the French squadron at the Battle of the Chesapeake under Antoine Pierre de Clavel.

In the action of 18 October 1782, under Captain Nicolas Henri de Grimouard, Scipion fought gallantly against two British ships of the line of 90 and 74 guns. Through good sailmanship, she managed to damage  and escape, but was destroyed the next day after she was chased and ran aground.

Sources and references 
Citations

References
 
 
 

History of the Royal Navy
Ships of the line of the French Navy
Shipwrecks in the Caribbean Sea
Scipion-class ships of the line
Maritime incidents in 1782